An association management company, or AMC, provides management and specialized administrative services to non-profit trade associations and professional associations using a for-profit approach. Many AMCs serve as an organization's headquarters, managing day-to-day operations and becoming the public face of the organization.

Services may include executive, administrative and financial management; strategic planning; membership development; public affairs and lobbying; education and professional development; statistical research; meetings management; and marketing and communication services. Orienting board members is common; AMCs lay out expectations for fiduciary oversight and point out conflicts of interest.

Fernley & Fernley, Inc., based in Philadelphia and founded in 1886, was the first association management company in the United States. More than 600 AMCs worldwide now collectively manage associations ranging in budget size from $50,000 to $16 million and representing more than 3 million members. AMCs can be found in most major U.S. cities.

The Alexandria, Va.-based AMC Institute accredits AMCs under the guidance of the American National Standards Institute. Current employees of AMCs are eligible to apply to become a Certified Association Executive.

Chicago-based SmithBucklin is the world's largest AMC, although Geneva, Switzerland-based MCI Group, a professional conference organiser that offers AMC services, has more employees: 1,900 as of 2016.

See also
 Professional Conference Organiser
 AMC Institute

References

External links
The Center for Association Leadership
 AMC Institute

Management
Non-profit organizations